The black-headed heron (Ardea melanocephala) is a wading bird of the heron family Ardeidae, common throughout much of sub-Saharan Africa and Madagascar. It is mainly resident, but some west African birds move further north in the rainy season.

This species usually breeds in the wet season in colonies in trees, reedbeds or cliffs. It builds a bulky stick nest, and lays 2–4 eggs.

It often feeds in shallow water, spearing fish or frogs with its long, sharp bill. It will also hunt well away from water, taking large insects, small mammals, and birds. It will wait motionless for its prey, or slowly stalk its victim.

The black-headed heron is a large bird, standing 85 cm tall, and it has a 150 cm wingspan. It is nearly as large as the grey heron, which it resembles in appearance, although it is generally darker. Its plumage is largely grey above, and paler grey below. It has a powerful dusky bill.

The flight is slow, with the neck retracted. This is characteristic of herons and bitterns, and distinguishes them from storks, cranes, and spoonbills, which extend their necks. The white underwing coverts are striking in flight.

The call is a loud croaking.

References

External links
 Black-headed heron - Species text in The Atlas of Southern African Birds

Gallery

Ardea (genus)
Herons
Birds of Sub-Saharan Africa
Birds described in 1826
Taxa named by John George Children